These are the official results of the Women's discus throw event at the 1990 European Championships in Split, Yugoslavia, held at Stadion Poljud on 28 and 29 August 1990. There were a total number of sixteen participating athletes.

Medalists

Final

Qualification
Qualification standard: Qualification Performance 60.00 or at least 12 best performers advance to the final

Participation
According to an unofficial count, 16 athletes from 11 countries participated in the event.

 (1)
 (1)
 (1)
 (3)
 (1)
 (1)
 (1)
 (1)
 (3)
 (1)
 (2)

See also
 1986 Women's European Championships Discus Throw (Stuttgart)
 1987 Women's World Championships Discus Throw (Rome)
 1988 Women's Olympic Discus Throw (Seoul)
 1991 Women's World Championships Discus Throw (Tokyo)
 1992 Women's Olympic Discus Throw (Barcelona)
 1994 Women's European Championships Discus Throw (Helsinki)

References

 Results

Discus throw
Discus throw at the European Athletics Championships
1990 in women's athletics